literally, "Burning mountain" is an active volcano in the Hida Mountains, lying between Matsumoto, Nagano Prefecture, and Takayama, Gifu Prefecture, Japan. It is one of the 100 Famous Japanese Mountains, reaching  at the highest peak.

Geography
Mount Yake is the most active of all the volcanoes in the Hida Mountains. Its two main peaks are the northern and southern peaks, but visitors can only ascend to the northern peak, as the southern peak is currently a restricted area. A crater lake lies between the two peaks.

High viscosity lava flowing from the upper regions of Mount Yake has led to the build up of a lava dome.

The heat from the volcano produces many onsen in the surrounding area.

Eruptions
In 1911, 22 minor eruptions were recorded. In 1915, during the Taishō period, however, there was a major eruption. The flow of the lava blocked the Azusa River, which caused the river to form a lake that was named Lake Taishō. The Azusa River is again flowing today, but the lake still remains.

In 1962, there was an eruption that killed two people staying at a small hut near the mouth of the volcano.

In 1995, a tunnel was being constructed on the Nagano Prefecture side of the mountain, through Mount Akandana, which was thought to be part of Mount Yake. At 2:25pm on February 11, the workers encountered volcanic gases, which were quickly followed by a phreatic eruption on Mount Yake, leading to the death of four people. Later explorations have shown that Mount Akandana is an independent volcano.

There is still an active fumarole near the mountain's peak.

See also

 100 Famous Japanese Mountains
 List of volcanoes in Japan
 List of mountains in Japan

References

External links 
 Yakedake - Japan Meteorological Agency 
  - Japan Meteorological Agency
 Yakedake - Geological Survey of Japan
 

Yake, Mount
Yake, Mount
Active volcanoes
Yake, Mount
Yake, Mount
Chūbu-Sangaku National Park
Yake
Yake